Maungdaw Township is a township of Maungdaw District in Rakhine State, Myanmar (Burma). The principal town is Maungdaw.

The township has a large Muslim Rohingya  population, roughly 80% of the total population in 2012. In July 2012, the government of Myanmar did not include Rohingyas, and instead classified as stateless Bengali Muslims from Bangladesh, on the government's list of more than 135 ethnic groups.  Other 20% population are  Rakhine, Bamar, Kamein, Khami, Daingnet, Mro and Thet.

There are five basic education high schools, three high schools (branches), eight middle schools, one middle school (branch), one affiliated
middle school, 16 post-primary schools and 125 primary schools as of 2011.

References

Townships of Rakhine State